Southern Belles: Louisville is an American reality television series on the Soapnet cable network that aired for one season from May 21 to July 23, 2009. The show focused on the lives of five women in Louisville, Kentucky.

Cast
Emily Gimmel
Hadley Hartz
Julie Smith
Kellie Frey
Shea Johnson

Episodes

Season 1 (2009)

References

External links 
 Official Website
 Official Facebook

Culture of Louisville, Kentucky
Women in Kentucky
2009 American television series debuts
2009 American television series endings
2000s American reality television series
Soapnet original programming
Television shows set in Kentucky
Television series by Endemol